Glendale Township may refer to:

Glendale Township, Saline County, Kansas
Glendale Township, Logan County, North Dakota